Barack Obama, the 44th president of the United States, has received numerous honors in recognition of his career in politics. These include:

National honors

Foreign honors

Scholastic

Honorary degrees

Awards

 2008: His concession speech after the New Hampshire primary was set to music by independent artists as the music video "Yes We Can", which was viewed 10 million times on YouTube in its first month and received a Daytime Emmy Award.
 February 9, 2020: Best Documentary Feature Academy Award for American Factory, made by the Obamas' production company, Higher Ground.  Barack Obama was not personally among the winners of the award.

Freedom of the City
  2013: Cape Town. Awarded with Michelle Obama. The Award was accepted on their behalf by acting United States Ambassador Virginia Palmer.

Namesakes

There are 13 community schools named after him, including: Barack & Michelle Obama Elementary School, St Paul, Minnesota; Barack Obama Charter Elementary School, Compton, California; Barack Obama Elementary School, Hempstead, New York; Barack Obama Elementary School, Richmond, Virginia; President Barack Obama School - Public School 34, Jersey City, New Jersey. Barack Obama School of International Studies (Public 6-12 IB), Pittsburgh, Pennsylvania, and Barack Obama Male Leadership Academy at A. Maceo Smith (BOMLA), magnet secondary school for boys located in the Oak Cliff area of Dallas, Texas.

References
50. "Barack Obama Male Leadership Academy." Wikipedia Entry.

Obama
Awards and honors